Antonio Pérez Mendoza (born 20 March 1986) is a Mexican retired stock car racing driver. He last competed in the NASCAR Mexico Series, driving the No. 1 Toyota for Jimmy Morales. He is the 2008 NASCAR Corona Series champion.

Racing career

Pérez began racing full-time in the Corona Series in 2006, winning Rookie of the Year honors. The following year, he won his first career race at Autódromo Monterrey. In 2008, he won the series championship.

In 2007, Pérez made his Busch Series debut in the Telcel-Motorola Mexico 200 at Autódromo Hermanos Rodríguez, driving the No. 68 Telmex Dodge. After qualifying 40th, he finished 42nd after suffering a transmission issue on lap two. Pérez returned to the series, then renamed to the Nationwide Series, in 2008 for the Mexico City round, driving the No. 86 Dodge with sponsorship from association football club C.D. Guadalajara.

Personal life
The son of former driver and current politician Antonio Pérez Garibay, Pérez's brother Sergio is also a racing driver and currently races in Formula One.

Motorsports career results

NASCAR
(key) (Bold – Pole position awarded by qualifying time. Italics – Pole position earned by points standings or practice time. * – Most laps led.)

Nationwide Series

Camping World East Series

WeatherTech SportsCar Championship
(key)

24 Hours of Daytona

References

External links
 
 

1986 births
Living people
People from Zapopan, Jalisco
Mexican racing drivers
24 Hours of Daytona drivers
NASCAR drivers